Berrick Steven Barnes (born 28 May 1986) is a former Australian professional rugby union footballer. His usual position is fly-half or inside centre. He is currently signed with Japanese Top League club Panasonic Wild Knights, but previously played in the Super Rugby competition with the NSW Waratahs and Queensland Reds. He also played for the Wallabies in international matches.

Early life
Barnes was born in Brisbane but raised in Kingaroy, a town in country Queensland. He attended Kingaroy State School and played junior rugby league for the Kingaroy Red Ants. He also played men's A-grade cricket at 12 years of age.

In 1999, Barnes took up a scholarship to attend  School. He switched to playing rugby union and was selected in representative rugby teams including the Queensland U-16s. Barnes continued playing rugby league as well, and was picked for Brisbane Broncos development camps.

Barnes was a star wicketkeeper-batsman in junior cricket  and was also good enough to win state championship medals in swimming. His sports master at Ipswich, Nigel Greive, described Berrick Barnes as "the most talented all-rounder I've ever been associated with".

By his final year at Ipswich in 2003, Barnes had played in the school's First XI cricket team for five years, and in the First XV rugby union team for four years.

Barnes began his professional sporting career straight out of school. He was scouted by the Brisbane Broncos, Queensland Reds and Queensland Bulls, but decided to join the Broncos.

Rugby league
When Barnes started at the Brisbane Broncos in 2004, he played in the Queensland Cup competition for the Broncos' feeder club, Toowoomba Clydesdales.

Kangaroos Coach John Dixon praised Barnes for his performances in the Queensland Cup, leading to his selection in 2004 for a Kangaroos Invitational XIII against Papua New Guinea in Townsville and for the Junior Kangaroos against the PNG Junior Kumuls in Lae.

Barnes also played for Queensland U-19 against NSW U-19 in curtain-raiser matches to State of Origin in 2004 and 2005.

Barnes made his NRL debut for Brisbane in 2005 at the age of 18, coming off the bench in round 8 against the Manly-Warringah Sea Eagles. He went on to make 9 NRL appearances for the Broncos, scoring one try.

However, shortly after his first run-on start with the Broncos, Barnes signed a two-year-deal with the Queensland Reds to switch codes and play rugby union.

Rugby union

Super Rugby career
Barnes played for the Queensland Reds from 2006 to 2009. He made 45 appearances and scored 105 points, including 6 tries, for the Reds in Super Rugby. In 2009 he was captain of the Reds side for the first half of the season while James Horwill recovered from injury.

In 2010 Barnes joined the NSW Waratahs, and later signed on until the end of 2013. He made 43 appearances, and scored 194 points including 4 tries for the Waratahs in Super Rugby. In 2011, he suffered from "Footballer's Migraine" and took three months off from the game, from June 2011.

Barnes retired from rugby in April 2020.

International career
Barnes made his international debut aged 21 in Australia's first pool match of the 2007 Rugby World Cup, against Japan. After only three minutes on the field, and with his first touch of the ball, Barnes scored his first Test try. He scored again, five minutes from the end of the game, which Australia won 91–3. After the match, in which he excelled, he said:
The crowd was unbelievable. It felt like a Boxing Day Test. Standing in that tunnel, I've never heard a roar like it. Standing next to the Japanese as we waited to walk out was pretty special. I was giving a few 'yahoos'. The boys gave me a bit about that. I was pumped. I wasn't going to hold it in.

The following week, for Australia's next World Cup match against  at the Millennium Stadium, Barnes was originally selected as a replacement. Stephen Larkham injured his knee, however, and Barnes was told on the morning of the game that he would be the starting fly-half. He played the full match and made a significant contribution to Australia's 32–20 victory, setting up a try for Matt Giteau and then scoring a field goal from 32 metres. He added another drop goal in Australia's next pool game, a 55–12 win over Fiji that assured Australia a place in the quarter-finals. Barnes was rested for the final pool game but returned to the starting line-up for the quarter-final match against England in Marseille, where Australia exited the tournament.

By 2008, Barnes had become a key member for the Wallabies. He scored the first try of the Robbie Deans era as coach of the Wallabies, against Ireland in Melbourne. A shoulder injury in the historical victory over the Springboks in the Tri-Nations disrupted his season, but he was selected for the 2008 Spring Tour. Unfortunately, in the first 8 minutes in the game against Italy he tore a posterior cruciate ligament in his knee and was sent home. The following year, Barnes was named vice-captain of the Wallabies for the 2009 Spring Tour but was sent home after he rolled his ankle at a training session in Tokyo, Japan and sustained a syndesmosis injury.

In 2010, Barnes missed selection for the first Test of the season against Fiji but played in the next match against England. He then went on to play the entire Tri Nations series, either starting or on the bench. Barnes was named co-captain of the Australian Barbarians side against England that played in Perth and Gosford. He captained the mid-week Wallabies team on the 2010 Spring Tour for the matches against Leicester Tigers and Munster, where his standout performance on that tour was against Italy in Florence where he scored 22 points in that game. Barnes handled the goal-kicking in Florence, in the absence of James O’Connor, kicking eight goals from nine attempts as he showed the benefits of his work with the Wallabies' South African kicking consultant, ex Springbok Braam van Straaten. In the final Test of the 2010 Spring Tour, Barnes, playing at inside centre, linked with fly-half Quade Cooper to help orchestrate a spectacular 59-16 demolition of France, in Paris.

Barnes made five appearances at the 2011 Rugby World Cup, which included the final 28 minutes of the quarter-final against South Africa, and the last 45 minutes of the semi-final against New Zealand; in both instances coming on at inside centre in the place of Pat McCabe. He stepped into the fly-half role after Quade Cooper was injured 21 minutes into Australia's Bronze medal playoff against Wales, and steered Australia astutely to a 21–18 win.

References

External links

ESPN Rugby prfile - Berrick Barnes

1986 births
Living people
Australia international rugby union players
Australian rugby league players
Australian rugby union players
Brisbane Broncos players
New South Wales Waratahs players
People from Kingaroy
Queensland Reds players
Rugby league five-eighths
Rugby league halfbacks
Rugby union fly-halves
Rugby union centres
Toowoomba Clydesdales players
Saitama Wild Knights players
Expatriate rugby union players in Japan
Australian expatriate sportspeople in Japan
Australian expatriate rugby union players
Rugby league players from Brisbane
Rugby union players from Brisbane